Softball is played in South Australia.

History and governance
Softball saw a "benefit" in the bombing of Darwin and the inclusion of Australia in World War II in terms of bringing in American military personnel who brought softball with them to this state. The state federation was one of the foundation federation members of the Australian Women's Softball Council in 1949. During the 1950s and 1960s, the Northern Territory did not have a territory organisation despite the sport being played in the territory.  Because of this, the national association allowed teams and players from Alice Springs and Tennant Creek to align themselves with the South Australian association. In 1971, there were 203 South Australian based teams affiliated with the state organisation, 312 in 1975, 353 in 1976, 209 in 1977, 397 in 1978, 532 in 1983 and 580 in 1984. The state association is involved with Softball Australia's Play Ball programme and is working to increase junior participation in the sport in their state.

National championships
South Australia won the Mack Gilley Shield in 1956. Between 1957 and 1994, they did not win another championship. The state hosted the Mack Gilley Shield in Adelaide in 1951, 1956, and 1962.

Facilities
Adelaide was the home to Australia's third international competition ready softball diamond, complete with lights.  It was built in 1984.

Players

American university players
Some softball players from this state have played softball for American universities, which depleted the level of high quality players available for local, state and international competitions.  They include Tracey Mosley who played for Oklahoma City University starting in 1991 and Natalie Kulas who played for Oklahoma City University starting in 1993.

National team members
Players from South Australia on the national team include Vanessa Stokes.

Men's softball
In 1944, the state baseball association created a men's softball competition but this league quickly folded.  A second serious attempt was made to create a South Australian men's team in 1974 with support from the women's softball association.  The team largely drew players from the American community who worked at the Woomera Rocket Range.  They would play exhibition matches against the South Australian women's team in preparation for the national championships. In 1982, there were 11 men's open teams in South Australia. In 1985, Australia had an unofficial test team of all starts who played against the New Zealand national team in Melbourne. Team members from South Australia included A. Oldfather Jr, and A. Oldfather Sr.

See also

 Softball Australia
 Softball in Australia

References

Softball in Australia
Sport in South Australia by sport